The Great Dividing Range, also known as the East Australian Cordillera or the Eastern Highlands, is a cordillera system in eastern Australia consisting of an expansive collection of mountain ranges, plateaus and rolling hills, that runs roughly parallel to the east coast of Australia and forms the fifth-longest land-based mountain chain in the world, and the longest entirely within a single country. It is mainland Australia's most substantial topographic feature and serves as the definitive watershed for the river systems in eastern Australia, hence the name.

The Greater Blue Mountains Area, Gondwana Rainforests and Wet Tropics of Queensland World Heritage Areas are located in the Range. The highest place in Australia, the  Mount Kosciuszko, resides in the Snowy Mountains portion of southern Great Dividing Range.

Geography
The Dividing Range does not consist of a single continuous mountain chain, but is rather a combined complex (cordillera) of mountain ranges, plateaus, hilly upland areas and escarpments with an ancient and complex geological history. The physiographic division name for the landmass is called the East Australian Cordillera. In some places the terrain is relatively flat, consisting of very low hills. The mountains and plateaus, which consist of limestones, sandstone, quartzite, schists and dolomite, have been created by faulting and folding processes.

The crests of the Great Dividing Range is defined by the watershed boundary between the drainage basins of river systems east (the coastal or rainward side) and west (the inland or leeward side) of it. The higher and more rugged parts of the "range" do not necessarily form part of the crest of the range, but may be branches and offshoots from it. The term "Great Dividing Range" may refer specifically to the watershed crest of the range, or to the entire upland complex including all of the hills and mountains between the east coast of Australia and the central plains and lowlands. Notable ranges and other features which form part of the range complex have their own distinctive names.

As a rule of thumb, rivers east/southeast of the Dividing Range drain directly eastward into the South Pacific and the Tasman Sea, or southward into the Bass Strait.  Rivers west of the Dividing Range drain in various westerly directions according to latitudes: the Murray–Darling basin in southeastern Australia (Darling Downs/eastern South West Queensland, West/Central New South Wales, Northern Victoria and the Murraylands/Riverland region of southeastern South Australia) drain southwestwards into the Great Australian Bight via the coastal Lake Alexandrina; the eastern half of the Lake Eyre basin in east central Australia (the Cooper Creek and Warburton River systems in Central/western South West Queensland and eastern Far North of South Australia) drain southwestwards into the endorheic Kati Thanda–Lake Eyre; the numerous rivers of western Cape York Peninsula in northeastern Australia (North/Far North Queensland) drain westwards or northwestwards directly into the Gulf of Carpentaria.

Climate

The sharp rise between the coastal lowlands and the eastern uplands has affected Australia's climate, mainly due to orographic precipitation, and these areas of highest relief have revealed an impressive gorge country. Areas to the east of the mountain range in southern NSW usually experience a Föhn effect, which is a dry wind originating from the Great Dividing Range that abruptly raises the air temperature in the lee of that mountain range and reduces atmospheric moisture. This dry wind, which elevates fire danger in the warm months, occurs because of the partial orographic obstruction of relatively damp low-level air and the subsiding of drier upper-level air in leeward of the mountains. The drier air is then heated more because of the adiabatic compression as it comes down the lee slopes, forming a rain shadow.

In the cool season, the Great Dividing Range would shield much of the southeast (i.e. Sydney, Central Coast, Hunter Valley, Illawarra, the ACT, the Monaro and South Coast) from south-westerly polar blasts that originate from the Southern Ocean, which bring freezing rain, sleet and snowfall in the upwind side of the ranges, such as in the Central Tablelands, South West Slopes and Snowy Mountains regions – All which have wetter winters. Being on the exposed western edge of the Great Dividing Range, places like Crookwell, Bright, Khancoban, Myrtleford, Batlow, Tumut and those in West Gippsland (namely the Latrobe Valley and Wilsons Promontory) receive significant precipitation in the winter and are therefore windward; whereas Cooma, Goulburn, Omeo, Bowral, Bombala, Nimmitabel, and Canberra on the eastern edge of the Great Dividing Range are relatively warmer and drier, particularly in the cool season, therefore making them on the leeward side, in addition to being sheltered from both easterly flows and western frontal systems due to their sandwiched positions. 

Moreover, Oberon, Delegate, Lithgow, Shooters Hill and Sunny Corner are on the crest of the ranges and thus exposed from all directions, hence their evenly spread rainfall. The main ski resorts in New South Wales, such as Thredbo Village, Perisher and Charlotte Pass, lie transitionally between the leeward and windward side (the former town being more leeward and the latter more windward). Although they receive substantial precipitation from over the crest of the ranges, they lack the persistent cloud cover which characterises truly windward locations on the western face, which are; Cabramurra, Kiandra, Mount Buller, Falls Creek, Mount Hotham and Mount Buffalo.

Precipitation
With leeward areas, precipitation is predominantly derived from the Tasman Sea to the east, since the Great Dividing Range blocks westerly cold fronts from the Southern Ocean (which tend to arrive between winter and early spring). Therefore, winters in leeward zones are drier (due to the foehn effect) with the summers being relatively wet. When it comes to windward areas, little or no precipitation is received from the Tasman Sea to the east due to the large distances and the Great Dividing Range; instead, precipitation derives from the South Indian Ocean and the Southern Ocean, advancing eastwards or northeastwards across Victoria. Winters in windward areas are generally wet and summers tend to be (relatively) dry. Transitional areas can be exposed to both westerly fronts and easterly flows, where they feature fairly uniform rainfall.

History

The Great Dividing Range was formed during the Carboniferous period—over 300 million years ago—when Australia collided with what are now parts of South America and New Zealand. The range has experienced significant erosion since. (See Geology of Australia.)

For tens of thousands of years prior to British colonisation the ranges were home to various Aboriginal Australian nations and clans. Evidence remains in some places of their traditional way of life including decorated caves, campsites and trails used to travel between the coastal and inland regions. Many descendants of these nations still exist today, and some remain the traditional owners and custodians of their lands.

After British colonisation in 1788, the ranges were an obstacle to exploration and settlement by the British settlers. Although not high, parts of the highlands were very rugged. Crossing the Blue Mountains was particularly challenging due to the mistaken idea that the creeks should be followed rather than the ridges, and almost impenetrable, labyrinthine, sandstone mountains. Although the most daunting obstacle to western expansion of the colony, the Blue Mountains actually lie to the east of the watershed that divides the Hawkesbury-Nepean system and the Murray-Darling system, the true Great Dividing Range. The watershed in this area lies to the west of Lithgow, passing near the locality of Mt Lambie and village of Capertee. There, as in some other places in New South Wales, the Great Divide is only a slight rise in the surrounding topography.

Knowing that local Aboriginal people had already established routes crossing the range and by making use of Aboriginal walking trails, a usable ridge-top route was finally discovered by Europeans directly westward from Sydney across the Blue Mountains to Bathurst by an expedition jointly led by Gregory Blaxland, William Lawson and William Charles Wentworth. Towns in the Blue Mountains were later named after each of these men. This was the start of the development of the agricultural districts of inland New South Wales. A road was built to Blaxland by convicts within six months. Easier routes to inland New South Wales were discovered towards Goulburn to the southwest, and westwards from Newcastle.

Subsequent explorations were made across and around the ranges by Allan Cunningham, John Oxley, Hamilton Hume, Paul Edmund Strzelecki, Ludwig Leichhardt and Thomas Mitchell. These explorers were mainly concerned with finding and appropriating good agricultural land.

By the late 1830s the most fertile rangelands adjacent to the mountain ranges had been explored, appropriated from the traditional inhabitants and some settled. These included the Gippsland and Riverina regions in the south, up to the Liverpool Plains and the Darling Downs in the north.

Various road and railway routes were subsequently established through many parts of the ranges, although many areas remain remote to this day. For example, in eastern Victoria there is only one major road crossing the highlands from north to south, the Great Alpine Road.

Natural components

Parts of the highlands consisting of relatively flat and, by Australian standards, well-watered land were developed for agricultural and pastoral uses. Such areas include the Atherton Tableland and Darling Downs in Queensland, and the Northern Tablelands, Southern Highlands and Southern Tablelands in New South Wales. Other parts of the highlands are too rugged for agriculture and have been used for forestry. Many parts of the highlands which were not developed are now included in National Parks.

All of mainland Australia's alpine areas, including its highest mountain, Mount Kosciuszko ( AHD), are part of this range, called the Main Range. The highest areas in southern New South Wales and eastern Victoria are known as the Australian Alps.

The central core of the Great Dividing Range is dotted with hundreds of peaks and is surrounded by many smaller mountain ranges or spurs, canyons, valleys and plains of regional significance.  Some of the major plains include the High Plains of South-Eastern Australia, the Southern Highlands, the Central Highlands and Bogong High Plains of Victoria. Other tablelands considered part of the Great Dividing Range are the Atherton Tableland, Canberra wine region and the Southern Tablelands.

The Dandenong Ranges, Barrington Tops, Bunya Mountains, Blue Mountains, Liverpool Range, McPherson Ranges and the Moonbi Range are some of the smaller spurs and ranges that make up the greater dividing range. Other notable ranges and tablelands which form part of the Great Dividing Range include the Liverpool Range, Mount Royal Range and the Monaro District.

In some areas, such as the Snowy Mountains, Victorian Alps, the Scenic Rim and the eastern escarpments of the New England region, the highlands form a significant barrier. The eastern escarpment is the site of many spectacular waterfalls which were formed by rivers plunging off the tablelands. In other areas the slopes are gentle and in places the range is barely perceptible.

Well known passes on the range include Coxs Gap, Cunninghams Gap, Dead Horse Gap, Nowlands Gap, and Spicers Gap.

Major cities located on the upland areas of the range include Canberra, Toowoomba and the outer suburbs of Sydney, Melbourne, Brisbane, Gold Coast and Cairns in north Queensland. Many towns and cities are located on the range, and also in lowland areas and foothills adjacent to the highlands. There is a strong natural history and cultural attachment to the Dividing Range region in towns and on many, sometimes remote, landholdings.
Some of the towns/cities located on the range include:

 Canberra - ACT
 Albury - NSW
 Queanbeyan - NSW
 Goulburn - NSW
 Cooma - NSW
 Jindabyne - NSW
 Katoomba - NSW
 Lithgow - NSW
 Oberon - NSW
 Bowral - NSW
 Yass - NSW

 Cowra - NSW
 Bathurst - NSW
 Orange - NSW
 Mudgee - NSW
 Cessnock - NSW
 Inverell - NSW
 Glen Innes - NSW
 Gunnedah - NSW
 Singleton - NSW 
 Armidale - NSW
 Tamworth - NSW
 Narrabri - NSW
 Coonabarabran - NSW
 Scone - NSW
 Dorrigo - NSW
 Walcha - NSW
 Guyra - NSW
 Tenterfield - NSW

 Roma - Qld
 Gatton - Qld
 Dalby - Qld
 Beaudesert - Qld
 Toowoomba - Qld
 Stanthorpe - Qld
 Warwick - Qld
 Kingaroy - Qld
 Biloela - Qld
 Emerald - Qld
 Moranbah - Qld
 Clermont - Qld
 Charters Towers - Qld
 Atherton - Qld
 Mareeba - Qld

 Omeo - Vic
 Healesville - Vic
 Gisborne - Vic
 Ballarat - Vic
 Bendigo - Vic
 Ararat - Vic
 Stawell - Vic
 Benalla - Vic
 Castlemaine - Vic
 Kyneton - Vic
 Maryborough - Vic
 Shepparton - Vic
 Wodonga - Vic
 Wangaratta - Vic

Water catchments

The lower reaches are used for forestry, an activity that causes friction with conservationists. The range is also the source of virtually all of eastern Australia's water supply, both through runoff caught in dams, and throughout much of Queensland, through the Great Artesian Basin.

Valleys along the chain of mountains have yielded a water source for important reservoirs and water supply projects such as the Upper Nepean Scheme, Snowy Mountains Scheme and Warragamba Dam.

The Bradfield Scheme has been mooted as a way to transport water from the Wet Tropics of Queensland in the coastal northeast of Far North Queensland via a series of Dams & Tunnels, southwest to inland dryer regions, including a tunnel through the Great Dividing Range into the Flinders River then a tunnel into the Torrens Creek in the White Mountains National Park then flows south into Thompson River / Cooper Creek, part of the Eyre Basin. Many other variations have been proposed.

The Great Dividing Range creates the drainage basins of the Australian south-east coast drainage division and the Australian north-east coast drainage division, whose water flows to the east coast and into the Pacific Ocean, Tasman Sea, and Bass Strait with the westerly Murray–Darling basin which flow inland, away from the coast into the interior plains.

Some of the rivers which flow west of the ranges includes the Condamine River, Flinders River, Herbert River, Lachlan River, Macdonald River, Macintyre River and Namoi River. Rivers that flow north into the Murray–Darling Basin from Victoria include the Goulburn, Mitta Mitta, Kiewa, Ovens, King, Loddon and Campaspe rivers. Rivers that flow east into the Pacific Ocean include the Brisbane River, Burdekin River, Burnett River, Clarence River, Fitzroy River, Hastings River, Hawkesbury River, Hunter River, Karuah River, Macleay River, Mary River, Richmond River and the Shoalhaven River. Those that flow south, primarily through Victoria, include the Snowy, Cann, Tambo, Mitchell, Latrobe, Thomson, Yarra, Werribee, Hopkins and Glenelg rivers.

Features
At some high hill passes the range provides cool sites appropriate for vineyards.

Railways

The engineers of early rail passages across the Great Dividing Range needed to find low sections of the range to cross, as well as suitable, "low" gradient paths up the mountains on either side. Rail passages include:
 Townsville-Mt Isa
 Rockhampton-Winton
 Brisbane–Toowoomba (1867) (2.0% gradient)
 Newcastle–Tamworth (c 1870), summit at Ardglen Tunnel (2073' HASL)
 Sandy Hollow-Gulgong railway line started in the 1930s to Maryvale (Main Western railway line), completed the 1980s to Gulgong, summit just west of Ulan - (500M / 1640') The lowest, 4th & last crossing in NSW.
 Sydney–Lithgow (1869), crossing the range via the Blue Mountains (summit near Bell 3507' HASL) (3.00% gradient) 
 Sydney–Goulburn (1869), though the divide is actually a few kilometres further west near the crossing with Parkesbourne Road near Cullerin. The next 300 km descending to Wagga Wagga was originally fast, but regrading in the 1920s introduced many curves.
Melbourne–Seymour, crossing the range near Heathcote Junction (1872) (2.08% gradient)
Melbourne–Bendigo, crossing the range near Woodend (1862) (1093' HASL)
Melbourne–Ararat (1875) via Ballarat

Road transport
Many of Australia's highways such as the Alpine Way, Great Alpine Road, Snowy Mountains Highway, Hume Highway, Illawarra Highway, Northern Highway, Melba Highway, Maroondah Highway, Midland Highway, Pyrenees Highway, Sunraysia Highway, Monaro Highway, Olympic Highway, Newell Highway, Lachlan Valley Way, Barton Highway, Federal Highway, Kings Highway, Great Western Highway, Mitchell Highway, Mid-Western Highway, Castlereagh Highway, Mulligan Highway, Capricorn Highway, Cunningham Highway, Gore Highway, Flinders Highway, Gregory Highway, Peak Downs Highway, Dawson Highway, New England Highway, Golden Highway, Bruxner Highway, Gwydir Highway, Oxley Highway, Warrego Highway, Summerland Way, Waterfall Way, Thunderbolts Way, the Calder Highway, the Western Highway, and the Murray Valley Highway traverse parts of the range.

Protected areas
Much of the range lies within a succession of national parks and other reserves. Most of the national parks are listed below, and there are almost double that amount of state forests.

Alpine National Park – Vic
Annan River National Park - Qld
Apudthama National Park - Qld
Bago Bluff National Park - NSW
Bald Rock National Park – NSW
Barrington Tops National Park – NSW
Baw Baw National Park – Vic
Bellinger River National Park - NSW
Blackbraes National Park - Qld
Blackdown Tableland National Park - Qld
Blue Mountains National Park – NSW
Border Ranges National Park – NSW
Brindabella National Park – NSW
Brisbane Ranges National Park – Vic
Budawang National Park – NSW
Budderoo National Park - NSW
Bunya Mountains National Park – Qld
Burrowa-Pine Mountain National Park – Vic
Cape Melville National Park - Qld
Carnarvon National Park – Qld
Cathedral Rock National Park – NSW
Conimbla National Park - NSW
Conondale National Park – Qld
Cottan-Bimbang National Park - NSW
Cunnawarra National Park – NSW
Daintree National Park – Qld
Dandenong Ranges National Park – Vic
Deua National Park – NSW
Dharug National Park – NSW
Dipperu National Park - Qld

Forty Mile Scrub National Park – Qld
Gibraltar Range National Park – NSW
Girraween National Park – Qld/NSW
Girringun National Park - Qld
Goobang National Park - NSW
Goulburn River National Park - NSW
Grampians National Park – Vic
Greater Bendigo National Park - Vic
Guy Fawkes River National Park – NSW
Hann Tableland National Park - Qld
Heathcote-Graytown National Park- Vic
Humboldt National Park - Qld
Kanangra-Boyd National Park – NSW
Kara Kara National Park - Vic
Koreelah National Park - NSW
Kosciuszko National Park – NSW
Kroombit Tops National Park - Qld
Kulla National Park – Qld
Kumbatine National Park - NSW
Kuranda National Park – Qld
Lake Eildon National Park – Vic
Lamington National Park – Qld
Lockyer National Park - Qld
Macalister Range National Park – Qld
Main Range National Park – Qld
Morton National Park – NSW
Mount Buffalo National Park – Vic
Mount Kaputar National Park - NSW
Mount Lewis National Park – Qld
Mowbray National Park – Qld

Mummel Gulf National Park – NSW
Namadgi National Park – ACT
Nattai National Park – NSW
New England National Park – NSW
Nowendoc National Park – NSW
Nymboida National Park - NSW
Oxley Wild Rivers National Park – NSW
Oyala Thumotang National Park - Qld
Paluma Range National Park - Qld
Ravensbourne National Park - Qld
Snowy River National Park – Vic
South East Forests National Park – NSW
Springbrook National Park- Qld
Starcke National Park - Qld
Sundown National Park – Qld
Tapin Tops National Park - NSW
Towarri National Park - NSW
Toonumbar National Park – NSW
Ulidarra National Park - NSW
Undara Volcanic National Park – Qld
Wadbilliga National Park – NSW
Washpool National Park – NSW
Werrikimbe National Park – NSW
White Mountains National Park – Qld
Willi Willi National Park - NSW
Woko National Park - NSW
Wollemi National Park – NSW
Wollumbin National Park - NSW
Woomargama National Park - NSW
Wooroonooran National Park - Qld
Yarra Ranges National Park – Vic
Yengo National Park – NSW

Awards 
In 2009 as part of the Q150 celebrations, the Great Dividing Range was announced as one of the Q150 Icons of Queensland for its role as a "location".

See also

 List of mountain ranges
 List of mountains in Australia
 Great Escarpment, Australia

References

External links

Australian rocks and mountains
Australian Explorer
Crossing the Great Dividing Range
Northern Rivers (NSW) Geology Blog – Great Dividing Range

 
Mountain ranges of New South Wales
Mountain ranges of Queensland
Mountain ranges of Victoria (Australia)
Drainage divides
Mountains of Hume (region)